Maurice Faure (5 June 1927 – 27 December 2013) was a French wrestler. He competed in the men's Greco-Roman bantamweight at the 1952 Summer Olympics.

References

External links
 

1927 births
2013 deaths
French male sport wrestlers
Olympic wrestlers of France
Wrestlers at the 1952 Summer Olympics
Sportspeople from Clermont-Ferrand